Sean Cronin may refer to:

 Seán Cronin (1920–2011), member of the Irish Republican Army
 Sean Cronin (Wisconsin politician) (died 2019), American meteorologist and political candidate
 Sean Cronin (actor) (born 1964), English actor and director
 Seán Cronin (rugby union) (born 1986), Irish rugby union player